The following article is a list of caves in Slovenia. About 43% of Slovenian territory is of karst nature and over 14,000 caves (2021) are known in Slovenia.

List of caves by number of visitors
The following show caves were the most visited in 2008 (ordered by the number of visitors):
Postojna Cave: 548,424 visitors
Škocjan Caves: 100,299 visitors
Hell Cave: 13,638 visitors
Predjama Cave: 6,133 visitors
Cross Cave: 4,935 visitors
Mayor Cave: 4,008 visitors
Pivka Cave and Black Cave: 3,509 visitors

List of longest and deepest caves 
It includes all the caves in the Slovenian cave registry, at least 1,000 m long and at least 300 m deep (May 2021).
The list is sorted on a cave score, obtained as a sum of normalized length (divided by the length of the longest cave, multiplied by 100) and depth (divided by the depth of the deepest cave times 100) - maximal possible score would be 200.

See also 
 List of caves
 Speleology

References

External links

 Online Cave Registry. Ljubljana Cave Exploration Society (DZRJL).
 Virtual panoramas of Slovene caves. Burger.si.

 
Slovenia
Caves